OSB may refer to:

OSB, Amtrak station code for the Old Saybrook station in Connecticut, United States
Oklahoma School for the Blind
OSBINDIA Pvt Ltd, a UK registered subsidiary bank that operates under the trade name OSB Group
OneSavings Bank plc, a UK registered bank that operates under the trade name Kent Reliance
Open Source Business Alliance, sometimes known as OSB Alliance
Operation Smiling Buddha, code name for India's first successful test explosion of a nuclear bomb (1974)
Operation Sovereign Borders, Australian border security operation
Oracle Service Bus, Oracle's enterprise service bus
Oregon State Bar, public body that regulates the legal profession in Oregon, United States
Oriented strand board, an engineered wood 
Orquestra Sinfônica Brasileira, in English the Brazilian Symphony Orchestra)

Christianity
Order of Saint Benedict, Catholic monastic order
Order of St Benedict (Anglican), Anglican monastic order
Order of Saint Benedict (Orthodox), Orthodox monastic order
Orthodox Study Bible, Eastern Orthodox Bible in English that includes the Septuagint